The Lady Owner is a 1923 British silent sports film directed by Walter West and starring Violet Hopson, James Knight and Warwick Ward.

Cast
 Violet Hopson - Pamela Morland 
 James Knight - Dick Tressider 
 Warwick Ward - Morton Buckstead 
 Arthur Walcott - Joe Sluggett 
 Fred Rains - Sir Richard Tressider 
 Marjorie Benson - Mrs. Sluggett 
 Edwin Ellis - Janning Burton 
 Jeff Barlow - Jenkins

References

External links

1924 films
1920s sports drama films
British silent feature films
British sports drama films
Films directed by Walter West
British horse racing films
British black-and-white films
1923 drama films
1923 films
1924 drama films
1920s English-language films
1920s British films
Silent sports drama films